The 2013 Kerala Sahitya Akademi Award was announced on 19 December 2014.

Winners

Endowments
I. C. Chacko Award: M. N. Karasseri (Thaymozhi, Study)
 C. B. Kumar Award: Adoor Gopalakrishnan (Cinema Samskaram, Essay)
K.R. Namboodiri Award: Dr. J. P. Prajith (Thanthrasahityam)
Kanakasree Award:Dr K Sampreetha (Neettezhuthu, Poetry)
Geetha Hiranyan Award: Jacob Abraham (Tattoo, Poetry)
G. N. Pillai Award: Saji James (Silent Valley: Oru Paristhithi Samarathinte Charitam, Nonfiction)

Fellowship
 Yusuf Ali Kechery
 N. S. Madhavan

References

Kerala Sahitya Akademi Awards
Kerala Sahitya Akademi Awards